Harshit Saxena (born 21 August 1985) is an Indian playback singer and composer. His debut was as music director for the Murder 2 film.

Saxena won the Upcoming Music Composer Award in 2012 at Music Mirchi Awards for his song "Haal-E-Dil"  from Murder 2.

Early life
Harshit Saxena was born on 21 August 1985 in Lucknow, India. His father, Abhilash Saxena, is a retired subdivisional officer in BSNL, Lucknow. His mother, Vandana Saxena, is a housewife from Varanasi. His elder brother, Shobhit Saxena, is a Singer from Lucknow

Career
Harshit Saxena has participated in a number of reality shows, and he was a finalist in Amul Star Voice of India, Jo Jeeta Wohi Super Star, and Music ka Maha Muqqabla.

He also appeared in the first two seasons of Amul Chhote Ustaad, and he performed the song "Happy Ending" in Tees Maar Khan, directed by Farah Khan.

He has appeared on various award functions shows such as “Star Pariwar Awards”, “Star Gold Awards”, “Star Screen Awards”, “Colors Global India Music Awards (GIIMA)”, Radio Mirchi Awards, and Big Star Entertainment awards

He was the music director for Mukesh Bhatt's Murder 2, He composed and sung the song "Haale Dil" in it. It was nominated for several awards, and Saxena received the “Best upcoming  Music Director” Award for Murder 2. He also worked as a composer for the movie Hate Story in 2012 and for Super Nani in 2014. He wrote and performed songs for both movies.

In 2015, he performed the song Meet Me Daily featuring Anil Kapoor and Nana Patekar  in the film Welcome Back.

In 2018, he Composed songs for the movie Hotel Milan . and sand 2 songs in the film Stepney, Allaudin - Version

In 2020 , He was the solo Music Composer for the movie  Sab Kushal Mangal . He Sang 4 songs in the Movie. namely, Na Duniya Mangi Hai, Sab Kushal Mangal - Title Track, Naya Naya Love, Ishq Ne Mara Re.

Personal life

Saxena is a trained physiotherapist BPT. Harshit Saxena lives in Mumbai since 2007.

Discography

As a singer

As music director

Accolades

References

External links

 
 
 

1985 births
Living people
Indian male singers
Indian film score composers
Indian male film score composers